Frostbite is a medical condition involving damage to skin and tissues due to extreme cold.  The term may also refer to:

Fictional characters
Frostbite (comics):
 Frostbite (G.I. Joe), a character that has appeared in a number of G.I. Joe comics
 Frostbite, a Marvel Comics character who was a member of the team in X-Men 2099
 Frostbite, a character that appeared in DC Comics' Young Heroes in Love

Films
 Frostbite (2005 film), an American direct-to-video film
 Frostbite (2006 film), a Swedish horror film, originally entitled Frostbiten
Frostbite (soundtrack), the soundtrack to the film by Anthony Lledo

Games
 Frostbite (game engine), a game engine developed by EA DICE
 Frostbite (video game), a 1983 game for the Atari 2600

Literature
 Frostbite (Mead novel), a vampire novel written by Richelle Mead
 Frostbite (Wellington novel), a werewolf horror novel by David Wellington

Music
 Frostbite (album), an album by Albert Collins
 Frostbite, a musical project by Einar Örn Benediktsson of the Sugarcubes and Hilmar Örn Hilmarsson aka HÖH
 "Frostbite", a song by Erra from Augment
 "Frostbite", a song by Michael Learns to Rock from Take Me to Your Heart
 "Frostibe", a song by Parkway Drive from Horizons

See also
 Freezer burn, the spoilage of food due to frost